The following is a list of the Teen Choice Award winners and nominees for Choice TV Actress - Comedy. Lea Michele receives the most wins with four.

Winners and nominees

2000s

2010s

References

Comedy Actress
Awards for actresses